Anthia sulcata is a species of ground beetle in the subfamily Anthiinae. It was described by Johan Christian Fabricius in 1793.

References

Anthiinae (beetle)
Beetles described in 1793